Fricot is a traditional Acadian dish. Fricot is such an important part of Acadian food culture that the call to eat in Acadian French is "Au fricot!"

The main ingredients consist of potatoes, onions, and whatever meat was available, cooked in a stew and topped with dumplings. The common meats used were chicken (fricot au poulet), clams (fricot aux coques), rabbit (fricot au lapin des bois), beef, or pork. When chicken was used, it was traditionally an older chicken, since an egg-laying chicken would have been too precious to cook. This accounts for the long cooking time, as an older chicken would have had tougher meat.

In lean times, a meatless fricot would be made. Fricot a la belette was one term for this, which means "weasel stew". The reference being made is that the cook is as sly as a weasel for leaving out the meat. In the opposite vein, Prince Edward Island Acadians use the term fricot a la bazette which means "stupid cook's stew", implying that the meat was forgotten.

The word fricot has its origins in 18th century France where it was used to mean a feast. The following century, it had evolved to mean "meat stew", and later still it became used to refer to prepared food.

See also
 List of stews

References

External links
 Acadien Fricot History

Acadian cuisine
Stews
Canadian cuisine